M. striata may refer to:
 Malacoptila striata, the Crescent-chested Puffbird, a bird species endemic to Brazil
 Marinula striata, a land snail species found in New Zealand
 Morula striata, sea snail species
 Mundulea striata, a plant species
 Muscicapa striata, the Spotted Flycatcher, a passerine bird species found in Europe and western Asia
 Myadora striata, a bivalve mollusc species

See also